Sandia (Spanish: Sandía, meaning "Watermelon") is an unincorporated community in Imperial County, California.

References

Unincorporated communities in Imperial County, California
El Centro metropolitan area
Imperial Valley
Unincorporated communities in California